Suburbia is a chain of department stores founded in 1970 in Mexico City. Its main activity consists of the sale of clothing, appliances, electronics and cell phones aimed at the socioeconomic middle and low classes. Suburbia currently has 166 stores in the Mexican Republic.

History
The first branch was opened on October 28, 1970, in Taxqueña, south of Mexico City, in which its concept was born as a department store for clothing, footwear and accessories for the whole family. In 1986, together with Aurrerá, Bodega Aurrerá, Superama, Vips and El Portón, Grupo Cifra was created. In 1994, together with Vips, Suburbia joined the Cifra Walmart group (which in turn changed to Walmart de México in 2001). In 1997, Suburbia had more than 9,000 employees.

On January 18, 2016, Walmart de México announced the start of the sales process for this format, which ended when the  El Puerto de Liverpool chain acquired 100% of the chain on August 10, 2016. The final closure of the operation (purchase) was carried out on March 10, 2017, when the Federal Economic Competition Commission authorized the sale. On April 4, having concluded the formalities of the transaction, the incorporation of the same to Liverpool began.

On September 12, 2018, Grupo Liverpool announced that the format Fábricas de Francia will disappear to convert the 41 stores into the Liverpool or Suburbia formats. In 2019, while 70% of Fábricas de Francia stores moved to Liverpool, the remaining 21 branches became Suburbia stores and since then, Liverpool began to expand Suburbia stores in the country, either reaching fashion malls where Liverpool is present as the main anchor, or in cities or towns with more than 70,000 inhabitants.

Description 
Suburbia is a department store focused on consumers located in cities from 70,000 inhabitants onwards, with 166 stores in Mexico, which have a sales floor area from 1,500 m2 to 6,000 m2. It handles a wide assortment of merchandise from the clothing, footwear, accessories, perfumery, cell phone, technology, toys, and recently electronics, technology, video games and furniture divisions.

Suburbia is usually located in the historic centers of large and medium-sized cities, as well as in shopping malls for daily use, such as the community center and power center, where Suburbia acts as the main anchor for this type of shopping center for daily use, as well as acting as a sub-anchor for lifestyle centers and fashion malls (such as  Plaza Mayor León in Guanajuato, Galerías Coapa in Mexico City, El Paseo Tehuacán in Puebla, Forum Tepic in Nayarit, La Gran Plaza Mazatlán in Sinaloa, Paseo Durango, Citadel in Monterrey, Altabrisa Mérida, Forum Tlaquepaque and Plaza del Sol, both in Guadalajara, among other fashion malls in Mexico).

After the administration of the Grupo Liverpool in 2019, Suburbia began to enter into recently created Mexican fashion malls (such as Paseo Querétaro, Parque Puebla, Galerías Santa Anita from Guadalajara, Jalisco, Parque Las Antenas from Mexico City, Ámbar Fashion Mall of Túxtla Gutiérrez, Sentura Zamora of Michoacan, Alaïa Guanajuato of the Guanajuato capital, Paseo Monclova of Coahuila (known as El Coloso de Coahuila), Galerías La Paz of Baja California Sur,  Power Center Tecámac in México City and Galerías San Juan del Río, among others), which Suburbia acts as a sub-anchor of fashion malls.

Likewise, under said administration, the disappearance of Fábricas de Francia at the national level, caused to Suburbia also enter cities with 70,000 inhabitants or areas where it was impossible to locate a Liverpool store in two ways:

 While 70% of the Fábricas de Francia stores in the country became Liverpool stores, the Fábricas de Francia that moved to Suburbia became known as Lo Mejor de Suburbia y Fábricas de Francia juntos en una sola tienda (The Best of Suburbia and Fábricas de Francia together in one store), whose This format focused on those former Fábricas de Francia whose sales floor size, number of sales, type of shopping center and / or population size of less than 130,000 inhabitants, was counterproductive to continue as Liverpool (such as the cases of Apizaco, Tuxtepec, Uriangato, Plaza Central in Mexico City and Plaza Sendero shopping centers in the cities of Los Mochis, Tijuana and Saltillo Sur, among others).
 Also, as a result of the disappearance of the Fábricas de Francia, as of 2019 Suburbia began to enter cities of 70,000 to 300,000 inhabitants and in areas where the construction of Liverpool is impossible (commonly in new shopping malls in those cities, in the which Suburbia acts as a main anchor) such as the cases of Atlacomulco, Zitácuaro, Tizayuca, Tulancingo, Gómez Palacio and, soon Navojoa and Comalcalco, among others.

Currently, Suburbia manages three types of stores (department store, boutique and outlet store), two of which are store sub-concepts, such as Zona Suburbia and Suburbia Liquidaciones:

Suburbia 
Department store created on October 28, 1970, in Mexico City (Suburbia Taxqueña), whose store format is suitable for cities with 70,000 inhabitants, which have a floor area of 1,500 to 6,000 m2. set up from 1 to 3 floors, depending on the store space. Is a department store suitable for the socioeconomic market C and D, that handle a wide assortment of merchandise from the clothing, footwear, accessories, perfumery, cell phone, technology, toys, and recently electronics, technology, video games and furniture divisions.

This store concept is regularly located in areas with a high population density (historical centers of large and medium-sized cities) as well as in shopping malls for daily use, such as community center, town center or power center, which Suburbia acts as an anchor store. Likewise, Suburbia is also usually located in fashion malls and / or lifestyle centers, in which it acts as a sub-anchor store for them.

From 1970 to 2016, it used to also be located in spaces of its former owner Walmart, located in commercial spaces or plazas where Suburbia shared the same parking lot and / or shopping center with Walmart, Bodega Aurrerá or SAM'S CLUB. However, with the administration of the Liverpool Group, from 2017 Suburbia also began to locate in recently created shopping centers where Liverpool is present as their main anchor.

In 2019, Grupo Liverpool converted 21 Fábricas de Francia stores to Suburbia.

Zona Suburbia 
Sub-concept of Suburbia located in historical centers of large and medium cities through stores with a much smaller space compared to a common Suburbia department store. Basically, it is a clothing store in which it only focuses on clothing and footwear, but with a much smaller assortment and a higher turnover in department stores.

Suburbia Liquidaciones 
Suburbia sub-concept located in popular areas of large and medium-sized cities, which is the Suburbia outlet concept. Basically, it is a departmental outlet store, whose socioeconomic market, mainly, is the D, in which it handles clothing, footwear, perfumery, accessories, cell phone products in which they are subject to discounts and much more attractive prices than in traditional Suburbia stores in season of sales and offers. They are department stores with austere decor, since this concept is handled by sales and liquidations under an outlet concept.

Currently, this concept has a presence in Mexico City, Puebla, Guadalajara and Tijuana.

Brands 
Suburbia manages a range of brands, both its own, national and international, through the lines of clothing, fashion clothing, footwear, accessories, makeup, perfumes, toys, electronics, mobile phones, technology and household items. As a department store, Suburbia manages its own brands of clothing, footwear and accessories:

Weekend
Contempo
La Mode
NON STOP
Oh Pomp!
Silver Plate
Mossimo
Precious Baby made by Carter's
Gianfranco Dunna
Metrópolis

Departments
 Clothing and accessories for women, men, juniors, children and babies from 0 to 24 months
 Perfumery and Accessories
Cell phones
Technology
Home
Furniture
Sports
Toys
Video game
Mundo Denim
Footwear
Sunglasses

Slogans
1980: Su Moda está en Suburbia
1980–1990: Navidad de Moda... Navidad Suburbia
1990: La moda sutil es Suburbia
1997: Suburbia, Moda y Calidad a tu alcance
1998: Suburbia, como quieres ser hoy
1999: Hoy es el momento Suburbia
2000–2007: Suburbia, La Moda al Mejor Precio
2007–2011: Sabemos que Sabes Comprar
2009–2018: Moda para la vida real
2018–present: Estrena más

References

Retail companies of Mexico
Department stores of Mexico
Retail companies established in 1970
1970 establishments in Mexico